Sweet Shanghai Devil is the second album by the Norwegian band Shining. It was released in 2003 by Jazzland Records.

Track listing 
"Firewalker"
"Where Do You Go Christmas Eve?"
"Jonathan Livingston Seagull"
"Sink"
"Shanghai Devil"
"Misery's Child"
"Cellofan Eyes"
"Herbert West-Reanimator/After the Rain"

Personnel
Jørgen Munkeby - saxophone, flute, clarinet, guitar
Aslak Hartberg - acoustic bass
Torstein Lofthus - drums
Morten Qvenild - piano

External links
 Last.fm album page

Shining (Norwegian band) albums
2003 albums
Jazzland Recordings albums